North Carolina's 20th Senate district is one of 50 districts in the North Carolina Senate. It has been represented by Democrat Natalie Murdock since 2020.

Geography
Since 2023, the district has included all of Chatham County, as well as part of Durham County. The district overlaps with the 29th, 31st, and 54th house districts.

District officeholders

Multi-member district

Single-member district

Election results

2022

2020

2018

2016

2014

2012

2010

2008

2006

2004

2002

2000

References

North Carolina Senate districts
Chatham County, North Carolina
Durham County, North Carolina